Johannes Paulus Stricker (18 October 1816 – 27 August 1886) was a Dutch theologian and biblical scholar. He attended the University of Leiden where he worked with J. F. van Oordt, a key figure in the new Groningen theology.  He sat his ordination examination in May 1841, and was appointed to a ministerial post in October of that year. In December of that year, he married Willemina Carbentus, an older sister of  Vincent van Gogh's mother. As an uncle he tutored the young Vincent in theology and biblical criticism in 1877–78.

In the summer of 1881, van Gogh became infatuated with Strickers daughter Kee. He proposed marriage, but was rebuffed with an adamant "no, nay, never" ("nooit, neen, nimmer"). Undeterred, he nevertheless continued to press his attentions despite the increasing dismay and disapproval of his family which eventually led to his leaving the family home for a while to study drawing at The Hague with his cousin-in-law Anton Mauve.

Works
Bijbels woordenboek voor het Christelijke Gezin, (1855) (Biblical Dictionary for the Christian Family)
Het Geloof in Jezus Christus, de Eenige Weg tot Zaligheid, (1861) (Belief in Jesus Christ, the only Way to Salvation)
Jezus van Nazareth volgens de Historie Geschetst, (1868) (Jesus of Nazareth, Drawn according to History)

References

Kathleen Powers Erickson, At Eternity's Gate: The Spiritual Vision of Vincent van Gogh, 1998, .

Leiden University alumni
19th-century Dutch Calvinist and Reformed ministers
1816 births
1886 deaths
Clergy from The Hague